Merle Zuver was an American football guard for the Green Bay Packers of the National Football League (NFL) during the 1930 NFL season.

References

People from Gage County, Nebraska
Green Bay Packers players
American football offensive guards
Nebraska Cornhuskers football players
1905 births
1969 deaths